St. Charles Township is one of sixteen townships in Cuming County, Nebraska, United States. The population was 185 at the 2020 census. A 2021 estimate placed the township's population at 183.

See also
County government in Nebraska

References

External links
City-Data.com

Saint Charles Township
Townships in Nebraska